The Porsche Tapiro is a concept car built by Porsche in 1970. It was designed by Giorgetto Giugiaro and has a traditional 1970s wedge design, which critics say somewhat resembles that of the De Tomaso Mangusta. The chassis is based on the Porsche 914/6, and it features gullwing-style doors.

Specifications 
The Tapiro is powered by a longitudinally mounted air-cooled 2.4 liter flat-six engine producing  at 7,800 rpm, and connected to a 5-speed manual transmission. This engine could propel the Tapiro to an official top speed of 152 mph (245 km/h).

History 
The Porsche Tapiro was introduced to the world at the 1970 Turin Auto Show, in Turin, Italy. The car subsequently made its US debut at the 5th Annual Los Angeles Imported Automobile and Sports Car Show in 1971.

In 1972, the car was sold to a Spanish industrialist who used it as his daily driver. The car was mostly destroyed after it caught fire. Most sources say the cause of the fire was a group of labor activists protesting its owner's labor policies, who planted a bomb under the Tapiro. The bomb exploded, burning the car but not destroying the chassis. Other sources say the car was involved in an accident and caught fire that way. The burnt shell was repurchased by Italdesign and is now on display in its Giugiaro Museum.

Legacy

The design of the car's body would later inspire the DMC DeLorean in 1981.

References 

Tapiro
Italdesign concept vehicles
Sports cars
Cars powered by boxer engines
Automobiles with gull-wing doors